Marinicauda pacifica is a Gram-negative and aerobic bacterium from the genus of Marinicauda which has been isolated from deep seawater.

References 

Caulobacterales
Bacteria described in 2013